John Reed DeSilva (born September 30, 1967) is a former right-handed pitcher in Major League Baseball who played in six games (two starts) for the Detroit Tigers, Los Angeles Dodgers and Baltimore Orioles during the 1993 and 1995 baseball seasons.

Fact
In between, DeSilva played winter ball with the Leones del Caracas, Águilas del Zulia and Tiburones de La Guaira clubs of the Venezuelan League during six seasons spanning 1993–2004. He posted a 16–8 record and a 3.23 ERA in 43 pitching appearances, including 30 starts and three complete games, striking out 143 batters while walking 59 in 181.0 innings of work. Nowadays, DeSilva is well remembered in Venezuelan baseball history.

Sources

External links
, or Baseball Gauge, or Mexican League, or Retrosheet

1967 births
Living people
Águilas del Zulia players
Albuquerque Dukes players
American expatriate baseball players in Canada
American expatriate baseball players in Mexico
Baltimore Orioles players
Baseball players from California
Brigham Young University alumni
Broncos de Reynosa players
BYU Cougars baseball players
Calgary Cannons players
California Golden Bears baseball players
Detroit Tigers players
Fayetteville Generals players
Lakeland Tigers players
Las Vegas 51s players
Leones del Caracas players
American expatriate baseball players in Venezuela
London Tigers players
Long Island Ducks players
Los Angeles Dodgers players
Major League Baseball pitchers
Mexican League baseball pitchers
New Jersey Jackals players
Newark Bears players
Niagara Falls Rapids players
Ottawa Lynx players
Palm Springs Suns players
Pawtucket Red Sox players
People from Fort Bragg, California
Rochester Red Wings players
San Antonio Missions players
Tiburones de La Guaira players
Toledo Mud Hens players
University of California, Berkeley alumni